Jakobstads Centralplan is a multi-use stadium in Jakobstad, Finland.  It is currently used mostly for football matches and is the home stadium of FF Jaro. The stadium holds 5,000.

References

FF Jaro
Football venues in Finland
Jakobstad
Buildings and structures in Ostrobothnia (region)
Sports venues completed in 1971